Pô is a city in southern Burkina Faso. It is the capital of the province of Nahouri. The main ethnic group (making about 60% of the inhabitants) is the Kasséna, a group close to the Gurunsi.  It is said to have been founded in around 1500 and is home to an army base, including the Académie militaire Georges Namoano.

In 1983, an army unit under Blaise Compaoré led a rebellion which resulted in Thomas Sankara's release from prison and ascension to the presidency. 

On October 31, 2014 Compaoré announced he had left the presidency and that there was a "power vacuum"; he also called for a "free and transparent" election within 90 days. Yacouba Isaac Zida then took over the reins as head of state in an interim capacity. It was reported that a heavily armed convoy believed to be carrying Compaoré was traveling towards the southern town of Pô. However, it diverted before reaching the town and he then fled to Ivory Coast with the support of President Alassane Ouattara.

"Pô Department", centered on Po, is one of five departments within the province of Nahouri in the Centre-Sud Region of Burkina Faso. It is located on the border with Ghana.

Pô National Park lies near the town.

Climate

Pô has an increasingly hot dry season and a warm, wet season. The warmest month is April, with an average high of 38 C (100.4 F), and an average low of 26 C (78.8 F). The coolest month, and wettest month is August, with a high of 30 C (86 F), a low of 22 C (71.6 F) and rainfall of 241 mm. Humidity is high in the wet season.

External links
 "Le Pays Kasséna" Burkina Faso Ministry of Culture, Arts and Tourism's web site for this area

References

Populated places in the Centre-Sud Region